The second season of the woman prisoned themed television series Vis a Vis premiered on March 31, 2016 and aired its last episode on June 22, 2016, consisting of 13 episodes. It was broadcast by Antena 3  in Spain.

The season was executive produced by Globomedia and was created by Álex Pina, Daniel Écija, Iván Escobar and Esther Martínez Lobato.

Antena 3, the series'  broadcast channel cancelled the series after this season. Fox Spain would later pick up the series for a third and fourth season and an additional spinoff.

The season started with Zulema (Najwa Nimri), Saray  (Alba Flores) and a reluctant Macarena's (Maggie Civantos) escape from prison and its consequences. With Sandoval's  (Ramiro Blas) bribery, Miranda (Cristina Plazas) imposed a stricter rules  and regulations in prison as a repercussion to the inmate's escape. With authority from the Director to use any extreme measures to discipline misbehaving inmates, some officials resorts to abuse of power with some of the inmates as victims of physical and mental abuse as well as rape. With threats looming around Macarena's family for getting caught up with the Egyptian's family, the Ferreiro suffer their darkest tragedy. Meanwhile, Macarena, Rizos and Saray's love triangle continues with Fabio (Roberto Enríquez) on the mix.

The show and cast were nominated in several award giving bodies including  two wins and four nominations in Spanish Actors Union Awards, five nominations in Feroz Awards and one win and one nomination in Fotogramas de Plata.

Cast and characters

Cruz Del Sur Inmates 

Maggie Civantos as Macarena Ferreiro
Najwa Nimri as Zulema Zahir 
Berta Vázquez as Estefania "Rizos" Kabila 
Alba Flores as Saray Vargas de Jesús 
Inma Cuevas as Ana Belén "Anabel" Villaroch Garcés 
 María Isabel Díaz Lago as Soledad "Sole" Núñez Hurtado 
Marta Aledo as  Teresa "Tere" González Largo 
Laura Baena as Antonia Trujillo Díez

Cruz del Sur Employees 

Roberto Enríquez as Fabio Martínez León 
Ramiro Blas as Carlos Sandoval Castro
Cristina Plazas as Miranda Aguirre Senén 
 Alberto Velasco as Antonio Palacios Lloret
 Harlys Becerra as Ismael Valbuena Ugarte

Macarena's Family 

Carlos Hipólito as Leopoldo Ferreiro Lobo
María Salgueiro as Encarna Molina 
Daniel Ortiz as Román Ferreiro Molina

Police Force 

Jesús Castejón as Inspector Damián Castillo

Recurring Cast and Guests 
Dunia Rodríguez as María Prieto "Casper" Téllez 
Sonia Almarcha as Lidia Osborne 
Irene Arcos as Carolina
Hugo Guzmán as Camilo Jalapeño
Verónika Moral as Helena Martín
Jose Javier Domínguez as Inspector Pipiolo
Carmen Baquero as Alba Vargas de Jesús 
Olivia Delcán as Cristina "Bambi" Marquina 
Mona Martínez as Carlota "Governor" 
Elena Seijo as Susana Tamayo Román 
Sara Vidorreta as Amaia Jiménez 
Rafael Núñez as Fernando

Episode List

Awards and nominations

References

2016 Spanish television seasons